Cyperus drakensbergensis is a species of sedge that is native to the KwaZulu-Natal region of South Africa.

See also 
 List of Cyperus species

References 

drakensbergensis
Plants described in 2007
Flora of South Africa
Taxa named by Rafaël Govaerts